Klaus Mindrup (born 16 May 1964) is a German politician. Born in Lienen, North Rhine-Westphalia, he represents the SPD. Klaus Mindrup has served as a member of the Bundestag from the state of Berlin since 2013.

Life 
He became member of the bundestag after the 2013 German federal election. He is a member of the Committee on Construction, Housing, Urban Development and Communities and the Committee on Environment, Nature Conservation and Nuclear Safety.

References

External links 

  
 Bundestag biography 

1964 births
Living people
Members of the Bundestag for Berlin
Members of the Bundestag 2017–2021
Members of the Bundestag 2013–2017
Members of the Bundestag for the Social Democratic Party of Germany